The Congress of the Peoples of Ichkeria and Dagestan (abbreviated CPID) was an Islamist terrorist organization under the joint control of Chechen and Dagestani rebel leaders with the support of foreign Arab mercenaries, founded in 1998. One of its subordinates was the Islamic International Brigade, a mujahideen movement that was a major combatant in the War of Dagestan. The objective of the CPID was to establish an Islamic caliphate in the North Caucasus.

References

Chechen–Russian conflict
Dagestan
Islam in Russia
Jihadist groups
Organizations designated as terrorist by Russia